Bloodsoul is the third studio album by the German death metal band Fleshcrawl. It was the last Fleshcrawl album to feature vocalist Alex Pretzer. In addition, it was the first of their albums to be recorded at The Abyss studio.

This album is typical of Fleshcrawl's mid-to-late-1990s sound, characterized by rapid speed passages, high-speed rolling double bass drum patterning, and well layered melodic guitar riffing. The general sound can be thought of as highly similar to that of other 1990s-era melodic death metal bands such as Dismember and Grave, with slight hints of Terrorizer-like grindcore/deathgrind sounds, especially in the vocals.

Track listing 
 "Bloodsoul" – 5:59
 "In the Dead of Night" – 4:19
 "Embalmed Beauty Sleep" (Demlich cover) – 4:49
 "Contribution Suicide" – 5:08
 "Age of Chaos" – 4:37
 "Recycling the Corpses" – 3:46
 "Nocturnal Funeral" – 2:41
 "Tomb of Memories" – 3:43

Personnel 
 Alex Pretzer – vocals
 Mike Hanus – guitar, bass
 Stefan Hanus – guitar
 Bastian Herzog – drums

Additional musician 
 Peter Tägtgren – guest vocals on "Bloodsoul"

Production 
 Produced by Fleshcrawl & Peter Tägtgren
 Recorded and mixed at The Abyss studio, Grangärde-Pärlby, Sweden, 27 December 1995 – 6 January 1996
 Engineered by Peter Tägtgren. Mixed by Fleshcrawl & Peter Tägtgren
 Mastered at Cuttingroom, Solna, Sweden
 All music and lyrics by Fleshcrawl, except "Embalmed Beauty Sleep," originally performed by Demlich
 Guest vocals by Peter Tägtgren in "Bloodsoul"
 Graphic work by Stefan Hanus with Orca Graphics & Alex Pretzer

References

External links 
 Fleshcrawl's official homepage

1996 albums
Fleshcrawl albums
Albums produced by Peter Tägtgren